Gorintaku is a 1979 Indian Telugu romantic drama film directed by Dasari Narayana Rao. It is a family sentimental film starring Sobhan Babu and Sujatha. The initial scenes of the film were shot in black and white. The title song "Gorinta Poochindi Komma Lekunda", written by Devulapalli Krishnasastri, casting Savitri is remembered even today. The film was remade in Hindi as Mehndi Rang Layegi.

Plot
Ramu's father is a drunkard, who neglects his family. His daughter dies after he beats her once, and Ramu (Shobhan Babu) runs away from home. Ramu studies on charity, and in medical college meets Swapna (Sujatha). Ramu tutors Swapna's siblings and lives in her summer house. Swapna is married off to Anand, a London-based doctor who is already married. By the time this fact comes to light, Ramu meets Padma (Vakkalanka Padma) and falls in love. A love triangle ensues, with Swapna finally sacrificing her love and Ramu and Padma come together in the end.

Cast
 Shobhan Babu as Ramu
 Sujatha as Swapna
 Vakkalanka Padma as Padma
 Ramana Murthy
 Prabhakar Reddy

Awards
 Filmfare Best Film Award (Telugu) - K. Murari
 Filmfare Best Director Award (Telugu) - Dasari Narayana Rao

Soundtrack
 "Cheppanaa Sigguvidichi Chepparanidi" (Lyricist: Atreya; P. Susheela and S. P. Balasubrahmanyam)
 "Ela Ela Daachaavu" (Lyricist: Devulapalli Krishna Sastri; Singers: P. Susheela, S. P. Balasubrahmanyam)
 "Ilaaga Vachchi Alaaga Techchi" (Lyricist: Sri Sri; Singers: P. Susheela and S. P. Balasubrahmanyam)
 "Gorinta Poochindi Komma Lekunda" (Lyricist: Devulapalli Krishna Sastri; Singer: P. Susheela)
 "Komma Kommako Sannayi" (Lyricist: Veturi; Singers: P. Susheela and S. P. Balasubrahmanyam)
 "Padite Silalaina Karagali" (Lyricist: Atreya; Singer: P. Susheela)
 "Eytantav Eytantavu" (Lyricist: Atreya; Singers: P. Susheela and S. P. Balasubrahmanyam)

External links
 

1979 films
Films directed by Dasari Narayana Rao
Films scored by K. V. Mahadevan
Telugu films remade in other languages
1970s Telugu-language films